La Enfermedad Incurable (The Incurable Disease) is a 1996 play by  Sebastian Mancilla Olivares, a Chilean playwright and actor. The play was written in 1993 and premiered three years later in Catamarca, Argentina. The play reopened in 2001 at the Teatro Urbano Girardi, once again under the direction of Olivares but featuring a new cast and crew. The play has garnered several honors, accolades, and awards.

Plot
The story centers on Juan, who has chronic epilepsy. His condition worsens steadily with age, but modern medicine lengthens his life expectancy. Over the years, doctors tell Juan's mother, Eleonora, that her son will most likely die by the age of eighteen. Knowing that he could die at any moment, Juan decides to live every day of his life to the fullest. During his travels, he meets Celina, a girl who sells vintage records at a store a few blocks away from his house. The pair strike up a friendship which then blossoms into love.

Original Cast
 Ismael Morandini – Juan Marchetti
 Lu Rodríguez – Celina Echague
 Juliana Reyes – Eleonora Aruzzi de Marchetti
 Az Martínez – Juan Marchetti (child)
 Pablo Marcolli – Uncle Agusto
 Macarena Figueroa – Aunt Marcia
 Micael Juárez – Doctor Terrille
 Javier Pérez
 Agustín Acosta
 Santiago Rivas

2001 Cast
 Agustín Figueroa – Juan Marchetti
 Micaela Linares – Celina Echague
 Cintia Díaz – Eleonora Aruzzi de Marchetti
 Santiago Acosta – Juan Marchetti (child)

Upcoming Remake
A remake of the story was considered in 2008, but with the death of Mancilla's mother at the time, the project was put on hold. It was once again revitalized in 2010, when Ismael Morandini would develop a remake in honor of Mancilla, who died from depression in 2009. Ultimately, Morandini was killed in a car accident on his way to Tucumán, Catamarca, Argentina and the project was once again in limbo.
In 2013, Az Martínez announced the project again, stating that the remake, to be titled "Angeles de Amor" (Angels of Love), is planned for release in late 2014.
Lu Rodríguez is also involved in development.

Trivia
 Az Martínez funded the 2001 version of the work. He was six years old when he originally played Juan Marchetti. 
 Lu Rodríguez could not avoid shedding tears during the play's ending.
 Ismael Morandini studied seizures and chronic migraines for six months to prepare for his role.
 Juliana Reyes could not hold back tears when she spoke ill of Juan, and said the role was draining to her. 
 The work was performed with the original cast in Salta, Tucumán, Mendoza and Ushuaia in Argentina.

References

1996 plays
Epilepsy